Vishal Sinha (born 7 March 1975)  is an Indian cinematographer who shot Hindi films such as Raanjhanaa, Ab Tak Chhappan, Bhoot and Darna Mana Hai. He debuted as an independent cinematographer with the film Bhoot directed by Ram Gopal Verma, and worked as camera operator in Ketan Mehta's Mangal Pandey: The Rising. Besides feature films, he has also shot many advertising films, documentaries and  short films.

Filmography

As Cinematographer

Special Thanks
2 States (2014)
The Mole (Short Film) (2008)
Khoya Khoya Chand (2007)

Nominations

Zee Cine Awards

References

External links
 
 
http://www.mid-day.com/entertainment/2013/jun/210613-raanjhanaa-movie-review-bollywood.htm

Hindi film cinematographers
Living people
1975 births
Cinematographers from Maharashtra